Syamsul Saad (born 3 March 1975) is a former Malaysian footballer who was a defender with Perak FA and Terengganu FA. He had a successful career with Perak.

In his first season with Perak, he won the Malaysia Cup. He clinched two Malaysian League title with Perak in 2002 and 2003. On 2004 he won the Malaysia FA Cup. His career was cut short after receiving a serious injury.

After retiring, he has worked as head coach at Kiddo Kickers Academy, before re-joining Perak as youth coach. He was promoted to head coach role for the senior team in 2016.

Syamsul appeared once for the Malaysia national football team, in a 2006 FIFA World Cup qualifier against Hong Kong in 2004.

He has two younger brother who is also footballers themselves: Shahrizal Saad who has played for Perak and Johor FC, and Shahrul Saad, former Harimau Muda B and Harimau Muda A player and currently in the Perak senior squad.

On 8 March 2017, he was appointed as a Perlis FA head coach.

References

External links
 

1975 births
Living people
Malaysian footballers
Malaysia international footballers
Perak F.C. players
Terengganu FC players
People from Perak
Association football defenders